Psydrax dicoccos is a species of flowering plant in the family Rubiaceae. It is found from southeast China to tropical Asia.

Botany
Commonly known as 'Ceylon box wood' or 'malakafe', it is an unarmed, smooth shrub  or more in height. Leaves are extremely variable, ovate, elliptic, ovate or somewhat rounded, 5 to 15 centimeters long, 1.5 to 10 centimeters wide, leathery, shining above, and usually pointed at both ends. Flowers are white, with very slender stalks, 5 to 10 millimeters long, and borne in compressed, short-stalked cymes. Calyx is cut off at the end or obscurely toothed. Corolla is bell-shaped, with a 4- to 6-millimeter tube, and five somewhat pointed lobes. Fruit is rounded, ellipsoid or obovoid, 6 to 10 millimeters long, slightly flattened and obscurely two-lobed.

References

External links
World Checklist of Selected Plant Families

dicoccos
Flora of Sri Lanka
Vulnerable plants
Taxonomy articles created by Polbot